Things Ain't What They Used to Be is an album by McCoy Tyner released on the Blue Note label. Like Revelations (1987), it was recorded at Merkin Hall and features solo performances by Tyner, in addition he performs three duets with guitarist John Scofield and two with tenor saxophonist George Adams. The Allmusic review by Scott Yanow states that "the pianist makes every melody sound like a fresh original through his distinctive chord voicings and harmonies. This is a strong effort by one of the best."

Track listing 
 "The Greeting" - 2:26  
 "Naima" (Coltrane) - 3:42  
 "I Mean You" (Hawkins, Monk) - 4:57  
 "Here's That Rainy Day" (Burke, Van Heusen) - 6:02  
 "Things Ain't What They Used to Be" (Ellington, Persons) - 3:52  
 "Joy Spring" (Brown) - 4:21  
 "Lush Life" (Strayhorn) - 5:34 Bonus track on CD  
 "Song for My Lady" - 6:28 Bonus track on CD  
 "Sweet and Lovely" (Arnheim, LeMare, Tobias) - 3:56 Bonus track on CD  
 "What's New?" (Burke, Haggart) - 3:53  
 "Search for Peace" - 6:09  
 "Blues on the Corner" - 6:25  
 "My One and Only Love" (Mellin, Wood) - 8:00  
All compositions by McCoy Tyner except as indicated
Recorded at Merkin Hall, NYC, November 2, 1989 (solos), and November 27, 1989 (duets)

Personnel 
 McCoy Tyner: piano
 John Scofield: guitar (tracks 3, 4, 6)
 George Adams: tenor saxophone (tracks 12 & 13)

References 

1990 live albums
McCoy Tyner live albums
Blue Note Records live albums